This article lists all power stations in Burundi.

Hydroelectric 

Burundi also has various power stations that are jointly owned by corporations in Burundi and neighboring countries.

Ruzizi I is owned and operated by Société Nationale d'Électricité (SNEL) of DRC and sells electricity into Burundi's Grid, despite having a contractual agreement, the electricity is considered an import.

Thermal

Solar

See also 

 List of power stations in Africa
 List of largest power stations in the world

References 

Burundi
Power stations